Lena Mari Anette Videkull (born 6 December 1962) is a Swedish former association football forward who won 111 caps for the Sweden women's national football team, scoring 71 goals. Videkull can be seen in the Sveriges Television documentary television series The Other Sport from 2013.

Club career
Videkull won the Damallsvenskan championship six times in her career. She was the league's top goalscorer on a record six occasions.

International career
Videkull made her senior Sweden debut in the final of the first UEFA championships for national women's teams in May 1984. Sweden beat England 1–0 in the first leg at Ullevi, then prevailed in a penalty shootout at Kenilworth Road, Luton after a 1–0 defeat.

Sweden reached the final again in the next edition of the UEFA championships in 1987. Videkull scored in the final but the Swedes lost 2–1 to Norway. In May 1989 Videkull scored in a women's international match at Wembley Stadium, adding to Pia Sundhage's opening goal as Sweden beat England 2–0 in a curtain–raiser for the Rous Cup.

In 1991, Videkull helped Sweden to a third-place finish at the inaugural FIFA Women's World Cup. Videkull was Sweden's top scorer at that tournament, and tallied her country's first ever World Cup goal in a 2–3 loss to the USA on match day one. She also scored the fastest goal in a women's World Cup after 30 seconds in an 8–0 win against Japan.

In 1993, she was given the Diamantbollen award for the best Swedish female footballer of the year. Coming on as a second-half substitute in the second leg of the 1995 Women's Euro semi-final, Videkull scored a hat trick in a 4–1 win, ensuring the Swedes a spot in the final as they defeated Norway 7–5 on aggregate. She briefly retired after featuring for Sweden in the 1995 FIFA Women's World Cup, which they hosted, but was tempted into a comeback for the 1996 Summer Olympics.

Matches and goals scored at World Cup & Olympic tournaments

Matches and goals scored at European Championship tournaments

Personal life
Videkull is a lesbian and lives with her partner Nina and their daughter, Felicia.

Notes

References

Match reports

External links

Living people
1962 births
Damallsvenskan players
Swedish women's footballers
Sweden women's international footballers
FIFA Century Club
1991 FIFA Women's World Cup players
1995 FIFA Women's World Cup players
Olympic footballers of Sweden
Footballers at the 1996 Summer Olympics
Lesbian sportswomen
LGBT association football players
Swedish LGBT sportspeople
Women's association football forwards
Swedish women's football managers
FC Rosengård players
UEFA Women's Championship-winning players
Footballers from Stockholm